The 2007 Junior Pan American Rhythmic Gymnastics Championships was held in San Cristóbal, Venezuela, October 4–7, 2007.

Medal summary

References

2007 in gymnastics
Rhythmic Gymnastics Junior,2007
International gymnastics competitions hosted by Venezuela